Aşağıyumrutaş is a village in the Ağlasun District of Burdur Province in Turkey. Its population is 111 (2021).

References

Villages in Ağlasun District